Neil Milward Forster (1927-2006) was a British field hockey player who competed in the 1956 Summer Olympics and was the chairman of B&C Holdings.

Early life
Forster was born in 1927. He is a graduate and former head of Hurstpierpoint College.  Forster spent time in the Navy's national service. Upon leaving the Navy, Forster studied economics and law at Pembroke College, Cambridge where he played tennis, cricket and rugby. While playing rugby each year, Forster got a Blue for Britain. Forster eventually joined Cayzer subsidiary Clan Line at the age of 25.

Olympics

Forster was a member of Great Britain's Field hockey team at the 1956 Summer Olympics in which Great Britain finished in 4th place.

Post olympics

In 1963, Forster was sent to India at the age of 36 to become a liner conference chairman. In 1967, Forster returned to England where he eventually became the director and then chairman of B&C Holdings.

Personal life

In 1954, Forster married Barbara Smith and had three children with her. Forster died on November 8, 2006.

References

External links
 
Neil Forster (Sports Reference)

1927 births
2006 deaths
Olympic field hockey players of Great Britain
British male field hockey players
Field hockey players at the 1956 Summer Olympics